The Nintendo Network is Nintendo's online service which provides online functionality for the Nintendo 3DS and Wii U systems and their compatible games. Announced on January 26, 2012, at an investors' conference, it is Nintendo's second online service after Nintendo Wi-Fi Connection. Former president of Nintendo Satoru Iwata said, "Unlike Nintendo Wi-Fi Connection, which has been focused upon specific functionalities and concepts, we are aiming to establish a platform where various services available through the network for our consumers shall be connected via Nintendo Network service so that the company can make comprehensive proposals to consumers."

The Nintendo Switch only uses the subscription-based Nintendo Switch Online service instead of using Nintendo Network as its online platform, although active Nintendo Network IDs could still be linked to the Nintendo Switch via Nintendo Accounts.

History

Pre-announcement 
On January 20, 2012, an image of Theatrhythm Final Fantasys box art was released showing a "Nintendo Network" icon in the corner of the box. It was speculated that "Nintendo Network" was a rebranding of the Nintendo Wi-Fi Connection.

Announcement 
Nintendo officially announced Nintendo Network on January 26, 2012. Nintendo stated that Nintendo Network will be an entirely new unified network system as opposed to a rebranding of Nintendo Wi-Fi Connection. Nintendo stated that the Nintendo Network will provide the infrastructure for online multiplayer (through universal friend codes on the Nintendo 3DS and a user account system on the Wii U), SpotPass, and the Nintendo eShop. During the Pre-E3 Nintendo Direct, Nintendo clarified that Nintendo Network would be the basis for Nintendo's new social network known as Miiverse. Nintendo Network will provide the network infrastructure for the Nintendo 3DS, for the Wii U, and was initially planned for future Nintendo platforms.

Features 

Notes
 NNID on 3DS – support for Nintendo eShop free downloads and Miiverse (sign-up/login only) 
 Swapnote/Nintendo Letter Box – currently used for local messaging only since SpotPass was disabled for the app globally as of October 31, 2013. As of November 2016, the app was succeeded by Swapdoodle.
The Miiverse app was made available on the Nintendo 3DS on December 9, 2013.

Discontinued services:
 SpotPass TV –  ceased operations on June 20, 2012.
 Eurosport – ceased operations on December 31, 2012.
 Nintendo Show 3D – last episode aired on March 28, 2013.
 Nintendo Video – the app ceased functions and was pulled from the eShop as of March 31, 2014, in Japan and the PAL region, and as of June 29, 2015, in North America. However, the name continues existing as a permanent Nintendo eShop category in North America, hosting many previous and future video content on demand.
 BBC iPlayer – was de-listed from the Nintendo eShop on August 31, 2016, and the app ceased operating by January 16, 2017, for those who already downloaded it on the Wii U. The service was terminated due to the end in the licence agreement between BBC and Nintendo UK.
 Miiverse – ceased operations on November 7, 2017.
 Wii U Chat – ceased operations on November 7, 2017.

Backward compatibility 

Nintendo Network previously provided legacy support for the Wii and Nintendo DS/DSi systems, as Nintendo Wi-Fi Connection had been absorbed into the service. This had ensured the uninterrupted online support and general backwards compatibility of the legacy Wii and DS families of game libraries when played on the current Wii U and the Nintendo 3DS. The free Nintendo Wi-Fi Connection service was globally discontinued on May 20, 2014, which ceased support for online multiplayer, matchmaking, and leaderboards for Wii and Nintendo DS games that supported those features, and this also applies to the legacy online support of these games when played on Wii U and Nintendo 3DS, including downloadable versions. The Wii Shop Channel was officially shut down on January 30, 2019, preventing any new games, channels, or WiiWare from being purchased and downloaded. Previous downloads can still be redownloaded if data from the Wii was transferred to the Wii U system.

User information

Nintendo Network ID 
Nintendo Network IDs (NNID) are user account systems for the Wii U and Nintendo 3DS, which allows players to access certain online features such as the Nintendo eShop and Miiverse. As of December 9, 2013, Nintendo Network IDs were implemented onto the Nintendo 3DS, becoming required for downloading free demos from the eShop, replacing the previous system in which eShop purchases were tied to a single system. Players who own both a Wii U and a Nintendo 3DS are able to link a single Nintendo Network ID to both systems, allowing funds added from credit cards or pre-paid cards to be shared across both systems' eShops. However, a Nintendo Network ID can only be used on one 3DS system at a time, requiring players to perform a system transfer to move account details from one 3DS system to another (IDs are currently tied to a single Wii U system, though a future update to resolve this has been promised, which is also essential for the company's long-term plans). Players may also sign into Nintendo Network on other platforms, such as the web-based Miiverse portal for computers, with functionality for tablets and smartphones also planned.

Nintendo originally planned for the Nintendo Network ID to become a prominent account system standard for all future Nintendo hardware releases, as well as any Nintendo-published apps released for non-Nintendo devices. However, in March 2016, Nintendo introduced Nintendo Account for non-Nintendo devices, and for the Nintendo Switch when it launched a year later, although the new account service complements Nintendo Network ID if users have one. For example, if users link their Nintendo Network ID to their Nintendo Account, they can share eShop funds between their Nintendo Switch and their Wii U/Nintendo 3DS.

In April 2020, credential stuffing from other breaches outside Nintendo which included NNID user and password information led to approximately 160,000 Nintendo Accounts becoming a target for malicious users that would use the NNID login to purchase digital goods via the account. By April 24, 2020, Nintendo temporarily disabled the use of NNID as a login method for Nintendo Accounts, emailed affected users to require password changes, and recommended users enable two-factor authentication. Nintendo stated in June 2020 that it found that an additional 140,000 accounts may have also been part of this same breach, bringing the total to 300,000, and had reset the passwords for all affected users and sent notifications to them.

Universal Friend Code system 
Nintendo Network currently uses a universal Friend Code system as its account system for the Nintendo 3DS. While these Friend Codes can only be registered for one user per system, they are functional for all Nintendo 3DS software used on that system. These Friend Codes are still tied to a single system and initially had limited transference under a conditional online protocol. After the Nintendo Network ID (NNID) has been introduced for the Nintendo 3DS in December 2013, the limit on system transfers has been waived, but both NNID accounts and Friend Codes remain tied to a single system at a time.

Games 

In Japan, the first games to introduce Nintendo Network officially were Theatrhythm Final Fantasy and Tekken 3D: Prime Edition, which were both released on the same day in February 2012. The first game that officially introduced the Nintendo Network outside Japan was Kid Icarus: Uprising, released in March 2012. Most games that were released with Nintendo Wi-Fi Connection support prior to the launch of the Nintendo Network were later rebranded as Nintendo Network compatible games, including Nintendo 3DS launch titles such as Nintendogs + Cats.

Nintendo Network compatible games launched alongside the Wii U in 2012. Ubisoft has confirmed that Assassin's Creed III and Marvel Avengers: Battle for Earth would launch with Nintendo Network support.

Online multiplayer 
One key feature of Nintendo Network is that it allows users to play together through the Internet. Users on the Nintendo 3DS can currently play with one another by entering their friend's universal friend code into the Nintendo 3DS's friends roster. Alternatively, supported games can allow users to play on the Internet without having to enter any friend codes, this feature is called online communities, and it debuted in Mario Kart 7. The process of online multiplayer is further streamlined through the use of a unified user account system first available during the launch of the Wii U and  later brought to the Nintendo 3DS. The user account system would eliminate the need to enter friend codes; instead, users can enter one another's user accounts. Nintendo Network also allows users to share rankings and to review the ranks of others.

Software updates 
Software updates, more commonly known as patches, have been available on both Nintendo 3DS, since April 25, 2012, and Wii U, since November 18, 2012, via a system update. These system updates gave the ability to patch downloadable titles, as well as retail games, through both the Nintendo eShop and HOME Menu. These patches have the main purpose of fixing security vulnerabilities and other bugs, and improving the usability or performance. Patches can also be downloaded while using other applications via the systems' Download Manager.

Nintendo eShop 

The Nintendo eShop is an online marketplace powered by Nintendo Network. The eShop allows users on the Nintendo 3DS and the Wii U to access and purchase exclusive digital games, Virtual Console games, and certain retail games. Moreover, users can obtain patches and additional downloadable content for digital downloads; in-game purchases are also supported. Before purchasing a piece of software, the eShop allows users to view ratings, screenshots, and videos pertaining to that piece of software. Developers can also release demos of both digital and physical games on the eShop.

Currently, purchases made through the Nintendo eShop on the Nintendo 3DS are tied to the system that they were purchased from, and they can only be transferred by contacting Nintendo's customer service. However, Nintendo has stated that this will change with the launch of the Wii U and the Nintendo Network user account system. On the Wii U, the user's purchases are tied to their Nintendo Network account but they cannot be transferred to other systems by the user as the Nintendo Network account is tied to a specific console. This user account system was added to the Nintendo 3DS via a system update on December 9, 2013, coinciding with Miiverse being added to the system, allowing players to combine their funds with their Wii U account.

In February 2022, Nintendo announced that they'll be shutting down the Nintendo eShop for 3DS and Wii U systems on March 27, 2023, at 11:00 PM GMT, with the ability to add funds being removed on August 29, 2022, at 4:30 AM GMT. This shutdown will also affect other games that use Nintendo eShop for Add-on content, such as Streetpass Mii Plaza, Nintendo Badge Arcade, Wii Sports Club, Mario Kart 8 and New Super Mario Bros. 2. However, users will still be able to redownload software they already purchased, download updates and download a small number of free themes on the 3DS Theme Shop. Also on this shutdown, the Pokémon Bank application on 3DS will become free of charge to use.

Digital retail titles 

Most Wii U and Nintendo 3DS retail software titles are available to download via the Nintendo eShop. The first of these titles was New Super Mario Bros. 2 for the Nintendo 3DS, which launched on the Nintendo eShop alongside its retail release in August 2012.

Add-on content 
Add-ons include downloadable content, addition of new features, and patches. Add-on software can be added to both digital and physical games.

Demos 
Game demos of retail and digital games have been available free to download on the Nintendo eShop since it was updated in December 2011. Developers are required to limit the number of plays available to the user. The first paid demo was released in Japan on August 4, 2011 and free demos were released in Japan on December 27, 2011 and in North America on January 19, 2012.

Virtual Console 

Virtual Console, sometimes abbreviated as VC, is a specialized section of the Nintendo eShop online service that allow players to purchase and download games from discontinued consoles and other software for Nintendo's Wii, Wii U, and Nintendo 3DS.

Wii U 
The Wii U uses the Wii U Menu and Nintendo eShop to access and purchase Virtual Console titles, respectively. Virtual Console games on the Wii U can be suspended and users can also create save states anytime. All Virtual Console game bought on the Nintendo eShop can be played on the GamePad through Off-TV Play.

The entire Virtual Console library available on Wii is also available on Wii U, but only through the implementation of the console's "Wii Mode" and Wii Shop Channel, to access and purchase Virtual Console titles.

Nintendo 3DS 
The Nintendo 3DS uses the HOME Menu and Nintendo eShop to access and purchase Virtual Console titles, respectively. Virtual Console games on the Nintendo 3DS can be suspended and users can also create save states anytime.

Special features in this interpretation of the Virtual Console allow players to create Restore Points, temporarily saving the game state for use later, and the optional ability to view games in their original resolution accompanied with special borders.

Miiverse 

Miiverse was a social network for Wii U and Nintendo 3DS, created by Nintendo System Development and Hatena powered by the Nintendo Network. It was discontinued on November 7, 2017. Integrated into every game, Miiverse allowed players to interact and share their experiences through their own Miis by way of drawings, text, screenshots, and sometimes game videos.

Nintendo TVii 

Nintendo TVii was a free television based service which allowed users on a unified system to watch films or programs from content providers, formerly such as Hulu Plus, Netflix, Amazon Video, and their cable network. Users were then able to select the source of the program they wish to watch and watch it on their television or on the Wii U GamePad. Users could also use the GamePad screen to get information on the show they are watching. Such information was received from Wikipedia, IMDb, Rotten Tomatoes, as well as individual source services. The information provided on the GamePad for each show included reviews, screenshots, realtime player positions in sports broadcasts, cast lists, trailers, and general information about the show.

Despite initially launching in late 2012 in select countries, development was plagued by various technical issues and delays, and the service failed to launch in Europe, subsequently canceling plans to launch it in Oceania, and was later discontinued in North America by August 2015. The Nintendo TVii icon and UI access had since been subsequently removed from the Wii U HOME Menu as of the 5.4.0E update on PAL consoles, and as of the 5.5.0U update on North American consoles.

Social network integration 
Since the service was connected to the Nintendo Network ID, each user had their own personal information stored on Nintendo TVii, such as their preferences, Mii and social network accounts. Users can then interact with the information as well as share and comment on the information on social networks such as Miiverse, Facebook, and Twitter in order to share reactions to live moments on TV through the GamePad while they watch their show on the TV screen. Users are also able to control their DVR through the Wii U and the GamePad. Nintendo TVii was made by Nintendo in partnership with i.TV.

Integrated services 
Nintendo TVii supported the following services:
 Hulu Plus (United States only; Japanese variant Hulu wasn't available on TVii)
 Amazon Video (United States only; European variant LoveFilm wasn't available on TVii)
 Netflix (United States only; global variants of Netflix weren't available on TVii)

Future plans had included bringing other DVR, such as TiVo to Nintendo TVii. It was originally announced that the service would become available in Europe in 2013. However, this did not happen, although Nintendo UK had since issued an apology in January 2014 for not launching the service when expected, and stated to expect further announcements in the "near future". On February 14, 2015, Nintendo Europe announced it had cancelled plans for the service's release in European countries including the UK.

The Wii U GamePad was also used as a universal television remote with a built in guide, even when the Wii U was powered off. Nintendo TVii itself was installed with every Wii U console, and did not require any additional fees to use.

Discontinuation
On July 24, 2015, Nintendo announced that the service would be discontinued in North America on August 11 of that year at 3:00 p.m. PT. Shortly after its termination, when users started Nintendo TVii, it redirected them to a screen showing them that the service is no longer available. Finally, on August 17, a Wii U system update removed the Nintendo TVii icon from the Wii U Menu and its HOME Menu, thus making the service no longer accessible. On August 29, 2017, Nintendo announced the service would be discontinued in Japan on November 8 of that year at 3:00 p.m. JST.

Video services 
Outside of Nintendo TVii, which was only available on Wii U, Nintendo Network offers a wide range of video services for Wii U and Nintendo 3DS. These services are only available for download on Nintendo 3DS since Nintendo TVii already integrated Netflix, Hulu Plus, Amazon Video and TiVo. The Wii U has a resolution of up to 1080p, while the Nintendo 3DS is limited to 240p. However, these streaming services are available independently from Nintendo Network services, and available resolutions vary per service.

These videos can either be downloaded to the system's permanent storage through SpotPass or streamed over the user's Internet connection. On the Nintendo 3DS, many of these videos are offered in 3D; on the Wii U, only 2D videos are available. The exact content available varies by region.

Canceled Services:
 SpotPass TV –  ceased operations on June 20, 2012.
 Eurosport –  ceased operations on December 31, 2012.

Nintendo Show 3D and Nintendo TV 
Nintendo TV was a video gaming online magazine published by Future Publishing for Nintendo Network. It was produced by the team behind the Official Nintendo Magazine and featured video reviews and previews and footage of upcoming and recently released Nintendo games. Episodes were released monthly on the Nintendo eShop, Nintendo Channel and YouTube where users could watch all the latest news, reviews and previews of Wii, Wii U, Nintendo DS, Nintendo 3DS and Virtual Console games. The series was exclusive to PAL region consoles.

Nintendo Show 3D was a video gaming online show produced by Nintendo and hosted by Jessie Cantrell. It featured video previews and footage of upcoming and recently released Nintendo 3DS retail and digital game titles. Episodes were released every two weeks on the Nintendo eShop free of charge. This series was exclusive to North American Nintendo 3DS consoles. Nintendo Show 3D released its last episode on March 28, 2013.

Short films 
The Nintendo eShop offers a wide range of downloadable video content for the Nintendo 3DS. These videos are mostly offered in 3D, and are downloaded right to the system's memory. In order to produce and distribute these short films Nintendo has partnered with companies such as BreakThru Films, Black Box Productions, Atlantic Productions, Ka-Ching Cartoons and DreamWorks Animation. Nintendo also planned to expand this video distribution service to even larger companies like DreamWorks, bringing exclusive content to Nintendo 3DS and Wii U owners.

Chat services 
Nintendo has stated that Nintendo Network provided the means for users to chat via text, voice, and video. All three means of chatting was available on the Wii U through its Wii U Chat and Miiverse services. On the Nintendo 3DS, the Swapnote (Nintendo Letter Box) application allowed users to send handwritten notes, pictures, and sound to one another through the Nintendo Network, powered by the SpotPass delivery service. Users were also able to globally communicate with one another through the Miiverse social network service.

Swapnote/Nintendo Letter Box 

Swapnote is a messaging application for the Nintendo 3DS. Swapnote was released on December 22, 2011, in Europe, Australia and North America via the Nintendo eShop, and can be downloaded at no additional cost, and is pre-installed on newer systems. This application allowed users to send hand-written/drawn messages to registered friends via SpotPass or other users via StreetPass. The app also allows users to freely embed pictures and sounds into their messages, and it also lets users change the position and the orientation of the picture and sound icons. Features are unlocked as players continue to send letters, such as the ability to hand-write/draw 3D messages, with additional stationery and features unlocked by spending Play Coins. Messages sent and received can also be saved indefinitely, in spite of the 3000 message limit. Additional stationery can be obtained via certain Nintendo related events, such as using specific software, or by saving them from other people's messages.

On October 31, 2013, Nintendo abruptly suspended the Swapnote/Nintendo Letter Box SpotPass functionality after discovering minors were sharing Friend Codes with strangers who had exploited the messaging service to allegedly exchange pornographic imagery. Additionally, the Special Notes service, which were also sent via SpotPass to promote Nintendo games, has also been suspended. Nintendo issued an apology to those who had been using the application in a responsible manner.

Swapdoodle 
Without any prior notice, Nintendo released a messaging application for the Nintendo 3DS in November 2016 entitled Swapdoodle. Regarded as a spiritual successor to Swapnote/Nintendo Letter Box, the app supports the exchange of 3D messages between users online using only SpotPass, albeit user content is limited to drawings, handwritten text, icons, and native in-game screenshots. Additionally, Swapdoodle has access to an in-app DLC store, allowing users to purchase bundle packs that include additional pens, ink units, stationery, message space, and drawing lessons.

Wii U Chat 

Wii U Chat was Wii U's online chat solution, powered by Nintendo Network. The service allowed users to use the Wii U GamePad's front-facing camera to video chat with registered friends. While video chatting, only the Wii U GamePad was needed, since on the TV, the same picture as in the GamePad's is shown. Users could have also drawn on the GamePad during a chat session.

If there is a game or another application already running, the Wii U GamePad's HOME button ring will flash indicating that there is an incoming call. The idea of the feature was originally seen in the introduction trailer of the Wii U in E3 2011. However, users weren't also able to use the service as a multitasking application, therefore not having the ability to make video calls without interrupting game play. Nintendo had announced a desire to make video chat possible through multitasking, but it was never implemented.

Wii U Chat was deployed in the Wii U's launch day firmware update. The feature was discontinued worldwide on December 27, 2017, at 3:00 pm JST.

Internet navigation 
Web technology for the Nintendo 3DS family and the Wii U is powered by NetFront NX. Previously, Nintendo partnered with Opera Software to release the Internet Channel on the original Wii, and the Nintendo DS & DSi Browser.

Nintendo 3DS 

The Nintendo 3DS Internet Browser is an Internet browser designed for the Nintendo 3DS system. It was released via firmware update on June 6, 2011, in North America and June 7, 2011, in Europe and Japan. The browser functions as a multitasking application.  As such, it can be used while another application, such as a game, is suspended in the background. The browser is primarily controlled with the stylus but can be controlled with the Circle Pad or the D-pad to cycle through links on the page.

The browser itself supports HTML, CSS, JavaScript, and some HTML5 elements but does not support Flash, video, and music files. It can also show 3D image files with the .MPO file extension on the upper screen and will allow the user to save the image to his or her SD card; this can also be done with 2D JPEG files. Additionally, the browser supports file uploads on forms, limiting them to JPEG and MPO images in the system's photo gallery.

An improved browser is featured on the New Nintendo 3DS consoles, notably having a different interface and the ability to play HTML5-based videos.

Wii U 

The Wii U Internet Browser is an Internet browser designed for the Wii U system. It was released on launch day alongside Wii U via firmware update on November 18, 2012, in North America and November 30, 2012, in Europe. The browser functions as a multitasking application and, as such, can be used while another application, such as a game, is suspended in the background. The browser is primarily controlled with the Wii U GamePad's touchscreen but can be controlled with the Analog sticks for scrolling and zoom, or the D-pad to cycle through links on the page.

The browser itself supports HTML, CSS, JavaScript, and HTML5 elements but does not support Flash, video, and music files. However, it can play HTML5 video and audio in websites such as YouTube. The browser has the ability to hide the TV screen through a "virtual curtain" (which shows the screens of the paused game), therefore allowing the user to browse the Internet with much more privacy through the GamePad. The browser can upload a screenshot of the suspended software, either from the TV or GamePad.

Exploit

The Wii U could run software, including homebrew, through the SD Card with an exploit via the internet browser with a malformed form for newer updates, and a malformed video on lower versions.

Loyalty programs

Nintendo Network Premium 

Nintendo Network Premium (known as Deluxe Digital Promotion in North America) was a loyalty program similar to PlayStation Plus offered on PlayStation Network. It was announced by Satoru Iwata on September 13, 2012, during a Japanese Nintendo Direct presentation.

Consumers who purchased the Wii U Deluxe Set in North America, a Premium Pack in Europe and Australia, or a Premium Set in Japan, received a free two-year subscription to this service which let Wii U owners receive points for each digital purchase. Members who bought games and apps through the Wii U Nintendo eShop received ten percent of the price back in the form of Nintendo Points, which could subsequently be put towards future online purchases on both the Wii U and Nintendo 3DS eShop. 500 points equaled to $5.00 which consumers could use toward a purchase on the Nintendo eShop.

Members received points from their purchases until December 31, 2014, and could redeem these points for Nintendo eShop cards until March 31, 2015. All codes from these cards were valid until June 30, 2015.

Club Nintendo 

Club Nintendo was a loyalty program available in Nintendo's key regions in which users register purchased Nintendo products in order to exchange them for a variety of unique rewards. The loyalty program was free to join and was committed to providing rewards in exchange for consumer feedback, and for the original purchase of official Nintendo products. Once linked to Club Nintendo, every product downloaded through the eShop was automatically registered in the Club Nintendo account. The user could also then take a survey for each product registered to earn additional coins/stars, which then prizes could be redeemed. It was discontinued in North America on June 30, 2015, and by September 30, 2015, in all other regions, and replaced with another loyalty program called My Nintendo.

Rewards 
Members of Club Nintendo could earn credits (referred to as "Coins" or "Stars" depending on region) which could be traded in for special edition items which were available only at Club Nintendo. Earning these credits was done primarily by submitting codes found on Nintendo products and systems, and for completing related surveys provided by the Club Nintendo websites. The Club Nintendo reward items included playing cards, tote bags, downloadable and physical games, various merchandise based on Nintendo's intellectual properties, special gaming accessories, limited promotions, and warranty extensions on select Nintendo products.

Other services 
 Nintendo Customer Service – US/Europe/Australia/Japan/Korea/South Africa
 Nintendo Online Store – US/Europe
 Nintendo All-Access @ E3
 Nintendo Network Maintenance Information/Operational Status

See also

 Camp Hyrule, Nintendo's web-based community from 1995 to 2007, adjunct to Nintendo Power magazine
 Randnet, Nintendo's Japanese Internet dialup service and community portal, based on the Nintendo 64 and 64DD from December 1999 to February 2001
 Nintendo Wi-Fi Connection
 WiiConnect24
 Nintendo Switch Online
 Nintendo eShop
 PlayStation Network
 Xbox Live
 Nintendo Network Services, handles all Nintendo Network operations
 Nintendo Network Business & Development (NBD)

Notes

References 

 
Multiplayer video game services
Nintendo 3DS
Online video game services
Wii U
Internet properties established in 2012